Chynah Tyler is an American politician from the Commonwealth of Massachusetts. She was elected to represent the 7th Suffolk district of the Massachusetts House of Representatives. She is a member of the Massachusetts Democratic Party and succeeded Gloria Fox in 2016. Tyler grew up in Boston, and attended Northeastern University, where she majored in criminal justice.

She is a member of the Massachusetts Black and Latino Legislative Caucus.

See also
 2019–2020 Massachusetts legislature
 2021–2022 Massachusetts legislature

References

Democratic Party members of the Massachusetts House of Representatives
Politicians from Boston
Northeastern University alumni
Women state legislators in Massachusetts
Living people
Year of birth missing (living people)
African-American state legislators in Massachusetts
21st-century American politicians
21st-century American women politicians
21st-century African-American women
21st-century African-American politicians